George Richard Ian Howe  (born 19 October 1949), known professionally as George Fenton, is an English composer. Best known for his work writing film scores and music for television, he has received five Academy Award nominations, several Ivor Novello, BAFTA, Golden Globe, Emmy and BMI Awards, and a Classic BRIT. He is one of 18 songwriters and composers to have been made a Fellow of the Ivors Academy (formally BASCA).

He has frequently collaborated with the directors Richard Attenborough, Nora Ephron, Alastair Fothergill, Stephen Frears, Nicholas Hytner, Ken Loach, Andy Tennant, Neil Jordan and Terry Gilliam.

Early life and career 
George Fenton was born in 1949 in Bromley, Kent, one of five siblings. He was educated at Carn Brea School and St Edward's School, Oxford. He began learning the guitar at the age of 8 and at St Edwards studied the organ with Peter Whitehouse. He did not attend music college but continued to study with Pete Whitehouse and subsequently with the ethnomusicologist and composer, John Leach.

In 1968 he appeared in Alan Bennett's first West End play Forty Years On. The following year he was offered a place at the Central School of Speech and Drama but had by then decided to continue with his music and had a record contract with MCA Records. For the next few years, he continued to work in theatre playing small parts and playing and writing music.

Theatre 
In 1974, Fenton received his first major commission, as composer and musical director for Peter Gill's theatre production of Twelfth Night by the Royal Shakespeare Company in Stratford-upon-Avon.

Throughout the rest of the 1970s and early 1980s, Fenton worked frequently as a composer for theatre productions. He continued to collaborate regularly with Peter Gill (composing for 9 of his productions) and also worked in regional theatre as well as for the Royal Shakespeare Company and The National Theatre.

Other theatre includes The Judas Kiss, Last Cigarette, Untold Stories, Allelujah!, Mrs Henderson Presents, Buffalo Bill's Wild West Show, Talking Heads, Beat The Devil and Racing Demon.

In 1992, George Fenton was credited with the Sound Track to the Buffalo Bill's Wild West Show at Disneyland, Paris.

Television drama 
Fenton wrote his first television score in 1976. This was a continuation of his collaboration with Peter Gill and it was for Gill's production of Hitting Town written by Stephen Poliakoff.

By the late 1970s, Fenton was working regularly in television. His television work has included LWT's Six Plays by Alan Bennett, Objects Of Affection, An Englishman Abroad, Talking Heads (2003), Bloody Kids, Going Gently, Walter, Saigon: Year of The Cat, Fox, Out, Telling Tales, The History Man (TV series), Shoestring (TV series), The Monocled Mutineer and the multi BAFTA winning The Jewel In The Crown.

Wildlife television documentaries
Fenton has composed for a number of notable wildlife television programmes, often collaborating with the wildlife broadcaster David Attenborough and the nature documentary filmmaker Alastair Fothergill. He started on the BBC's long-running series Wildlife on One and Natural World.

Since 1990, he has written the music for a number of wildlife series including The Trials of Life, Life in the Freezer, The Blue Planet, Planet Earth, and Frozen Planet. Other documentaries include Beyond The Clouds, Shanghai Vice and Between Clouds and Dreams (for Director Phil Agland).

In 2003, he composed and conducted the music for the feature documentary film, Deep Blue. It was performed by the Berlin Philharmonic Orchestra – the first film score the orchestra had recorded in its history.  In 2007 they repeated the collaboration for the feature documentary film, Earth.

Television and radio themes
Fenton has composed the jingles or theme music to dozens of British television and radio programs, including Shoestring, Bergerac, One O'Clock News, Six O'Clock News and Nine O'Clock News, Newsnight and Newsnight Review, On the Record, Omnibus, BBC Breakfast Time, BBC World News, Reporting Scotland, London Plus, Telly Addicts, Daily Politics, and BBC Radio 4's PM programme.

Feature films
Fenton has written the music for over one hundred feature films.

His first major break came in 1982  with Richard Attenborough's biopic Gandhi, for which he was nominated—with his collaborator, Ravi Shankar for the Academy Award for Original Music Score. Fenton wrote another four film scores for Attenborough's films: Cry Freedom, Shadowlands, In Love and War and Grey Owl.

He has also frequently worked with the theatre and film director Nicholas Hytner, writing the score for all six of the movies that Hytner has directed. These are The Madness of King George, The Crucible, The Object of My Affection, Center Stage, The History Boys and The Lady in the Van. The latter three of these allowed Fenton to collaborate again with their writer Alan Bennett. Although Fenton composed the original music of five of these films, for The Madness of King George he instead adapted and arranged the music of Handel.

Fenton's long-standing collaboration with Stephen Frears has not been limited to television productions. Fenton has scored four of Frear's feature films: Dangerous Liaisons, Hero, Mary Reilly and Mrs Henderson Presents. He also worked with the director Neil Jordan, scoring The Company of Wolves, High Spirits and We're No Angels.

Fenton has scored more feature films for Ken Loach than for any other filmmaker, by 2019, a total of 17. This started in 1994 with Ladybird, Ladybird followed by Land and Freedom, Carla's Song, My Name Is Joe, Bread and Roses, The Navigators, Sweet Sixteen, Ae Fond Kiss..., The Wind That Shakes the Barley which won the Palme d'Or at the 2006 Cannes Film Festival, It's a Free World..., Looking for Eric, The Angels' Share, the documentary film The Spirit of '45, Jimmy's Hall, I, Daniel Blake and, most recently, Sorry We Missed You.

Fenton has developed other long-standing collaborations with filmmakers, scoring several films each for directors as diverse as Harold Ramis, Nora Ephron, Phil Joanou and Andy Tennant, including Multiplicity, Groundhog Day, Mixed Nuts, You've Got Mail, Final Analysis, The Fisher King, Heaven's Prisoners,  Ever After: A Cinderella Story, Sweet Home Alabama (film), Anna and the King, Hitch, Bewitched and The Secret: Dare to Dream.

Live 
Fenton won an Ivor Novello Award, BAFTA and Emmy Award for Best Television Score for The Blue Planet and, in October 2002, he created "The Blue Planet in Concert" which was premiered at the Royal Festival Hall in London. He subsequently created Planet Earth In Concert and Frozen Planet In Concert and took these concerts to venues such as Hollywood Bowl, Sydney Opera House, Wembley Arena and the Ziggo Dome in Amsterdam.

In 2003, he scored and conducted the music for the documentary film Deep Blue, which was performed by the Berlin Philharmonic Orchestra, the first film score the orchestra had recorded in its history. In 2007, they repeated the collaboration for the documentary film, Earth. With the producer Jane Carter, Fenton turned each of the scores into concert works. His live film scores continue to be performed by orchestras worldwide.

Honours
Fenton was appointed Commander of the Order of the British Empire (CBE) in the 2023 New Year Honours for services to music.

Discography

Films

Awards and nominations

Academy Awards
1983 Nominated Best Original Score for Gandhi (shared with Ravi Shankar)
1988 Nominated Best Original Score and Best Original Song both for Cry Freedom (both shared with Jonas Gwangwa)
1989 Nominated Best Original Score for Dangerous Liaisons
1992 Nominated Best Original Score for The Fisher King

BAFTA Awards
1981 Nominated BAFTA TV Award Best Original Television Music for Shoestring (Also for: Bloody Kids, Fox)
1982 Won BAFTA TV Award Best Original Television Music for Bergerac (also for The History Man, Going Gently, the BBC News theme)
1983 Nominated BAFTA Film Award Best Score for Gandhi
1985 Nominated BAFTA TV Award Best Original Television Music for The Jewel in the Crown
1987 Won BAFTA TV Award Best Original Television Music for The Monocled Mutineer
1988 Nominated BAFTA Film Award Best Score for Cry Freedom
1989 Nominated BAFTA TV Award Best Original Television Music for Talking Heads
1990 Nominated BAFTA Film Award Best Original Film Score for Dangerous Liaisons
1991 Nominated BAFTA Film Award Best Original Film Score for Memphis Belle
1991 Nominated BAFTA TV Award Best Original Television Music for The Trials of Life
1994 Nominated BAFTA TV Award Best Original Television Music for Life in the Freezer
1996 Nominated Anthony Asquith Award for Film Music for The Madness of King George
2002 Won BAFTA TV Award Best Original Television Music for The Blue Planet
2006 Nominated Anthony Asquith Award for Film Music for Mrs Henderson Presents
2007 Nominated BAFTA TV Award Best Original TV Music for Planet Earth
2012 Nominated BAFTA TV Award Best Original Tv Music for Frozen Planet

Emmy Awards
2002 Won Primetime Emmy for Outstanding Music Composition for a Series for The Blue Planet - Seas of Life: Ocean World
2005 Nominated Primetime Emmy Outstanding Music Composition for Pride
2007 Won Primetime Emmy for Outstanding Music Composition for Planet Earth – From Pole to Pole

Golden Globes
1988 Nominated Golden Globe Best Original Score – Motion Picture for Cry Freedom (shared with Jonas Gwangwa)
2000 Nominated Golden Globe Best Original Score – Motion Picture for Anna and the King
2000 Nominated Golden Globe Best Original Song – Motion Picture for Anna and the King

Grammy Awards
1984 Nominated Grammy Best Album of Original Score Written for a Motion Picture or Television Special for Gandhi (shared with Ravi Shankar)
1989 Nominated Grammy Best Song Written Specifically for a Motion Picture or for Television for Cry Freedom (shared with Jonas Gwangwa)

Ivor Novello Awards
1980 Nominated Best Best Theme from A TV or Radio production for Shoestring
1981 Nominated Best Best Theme from A TV or Radio production for Fox
1983 Nominated Best Best Theme from A TV or Radio production for Omnibus
1983 Won Best Film Theme or Song for Gandhi (shared with Ravi Shankar)
1985 Won Best Theme from A TV or Radio production for The Jewel in the Crown
1985 Nominated Best Theme or Song for The Company of Wolves
1987 Won Best Best Theme from A TV or Radio production for The Monocled Mutineer
1988. Won Best Film Score for Cry Freedom (shared with Jonas Gwangwa)
1993 Nominated Best Film Theme or Song for Final Analysis
1995 Nominated for Best Theme from A TV or Radio production for Beyond The Clouds
1995 Won Best Film Score for Shadowlands
1999 Nominated Best Film Score for Ever After
2000 Nominated Best Film Score for Anna and the King
2002 Nominated Best Original TV Music for The Blue Planet
2005 Nominated Best Original Film Score for Deep Blue
2010 Nominated Best TV Soundtrack for Life

Classical Brit Awards
2007 Winner Best Soundtrack for Planet Earth

EFA Awards (European Film Awards)
2012 Nominated European Composer for The Angels' Share

IFMCA Awards (Film Music Critics)
1998 Nominated Film Score of the Year for Dangerous Beauty
1998 Nominated Best Original Score for a Drama Film for Dangerous Beauty
1998 Nominated Film Composer of the Year
1998 Nominated Best Original Score for a Drama Film for Ever After: A Cinderella Story
1999 Nominated Film Composer of The Year
2007 Winner Best Original Score for Television for Planet Earth
2008 Winner Best Original Score for a Documentary for Earth
2009 Nominated Best Original Score for a Comedy Film for Fool’s Gold
2010 Nominated Best Original Score for a Television Series for Life
2012 Nominated Best Original Score for a Documentary for Frozen Planet
2015 Nominated Best Original Score for a Documentary for Bears
2016 Nominated Best Original Score for a Comedy Film for The Lady in the Van

World Soundtrack Awards
2015 Winner Lifetime Achievement

BMI Awards
1994 Winner Film Music for Groundhog Day
1999 Winner Film Music for You’ve Got Mail
2003 Winner Film Music for Sweet Home Alabama
2005 Winner Film Music for Hitch
2010 Winner Film Music for The Bounty Hunter

Other work
Fenton founded the Association of Professional Composers which later amalgamated with the British Academy of Songwriters, Composers and Authors and with the Composers' Guild of Great Britain to become the British Academy of Composers & Songwriters. He is a member of the Academy of Motion Picture Arts and Sciences and is a visiting professor at the Royal College of Music and the University of Nottingham.

In 2020, he and Simon Chamberlain released the album, The Piano Framed.  Available digitally and on CD and vinyl, it has solo piano arrangements by Chamberlain of many of Fenton's scores including The Blue Planet, Dangerous Liaisons, The Lady in the Van and Groundhog Day.

References

External links
 
 
 
 
 
 British Film Institute, Film and TV credits
 The Gorfaine / Schwartz Agency PDF file
 George Fenton's The Blue Planet Live!

1949 births
Academics of the Royal College of Music
BAFTA winners (people)
Emmy Award winners
English film score composers
English male film score composers
English television composers
Ivor Novello Award winners
Living people
Male television composers
Musicians from London
People educated at St Edward's School, Oxford
People from Bromley
Varèse Sarabande Records artists
DreamWorks Animation people
Sony Pictures Animation people